The Alton line is a railway line in Hampshire and Surrey, England, operated by South Western Railway as a relatively long branch of the South West Main Line.

The branch leaves the main line at Pirbright Junction to the west of Brookwood station, Surrey, then turns to the southwest. The route crosses and recrosses the Surrey / Hampshire border, and serves the towns of Aldershot and Farnham before reaching its present-day terminus at Alton in East Hampshire. The line originally continued west to Winchester; the section between Alton and New Alresford is preserved as the heritage Watercress line.

The Alton line was electrified (750 V DC third rail) during the late interwar years by Southern Railway. Aside from regular electric trains, freight trains operated by DB Cargo UK and steam trains connected to the Mid Hants Watercress Railway (by way of rolling stock supply or special excursion) operate on the line.

History

The first railway line to Farnham opened in 1849 and was a branch from Guildford via Tongham. The line from Farnham to Alton opened on 28 July 1852. On 2 October 1865 the Alton, Aldershot & Winchester Railway extended the line from Alton to Winchester, with Alton station moving to a new site. On 2 May 1870 the present-day line from Brookwood to Farnham opened. Alton became a junction station on 1 June 1901 when the Basingstoke and Alton Light Railway opened, temporarily closed 1917–1924 as the track was taken up for use in France during the First World War, but reopened after local pressure. Use was light and the line closed in 1933. This line closed to passengers in 1955.

The section between Alton and Winchester was closed in 1973. The 10 mile stretch from Alton to Alresford was reopened in stages from 1977 to 1985 as the Watercress heritage railway. The route between Alresford and Winchester is unlikely to be reopened, as houses and the M3 motorway have since been built across the route.

Temporary closures
August 2006
The line closed briefly in August 2006 between Brookwood and Ash Vale due to a landslip at Foxhills Tunnel, causing most commuter journeys to be diverted via Guildford.
April 2016
Heavy rainfall destabilised the embankment near Wrecclesham causing closure of the line between 13 April 2016 and 3 May 2016. Network Rail undertook further work to fully stabilise the earthworks.

Passenger services

There are two trains per hour in each direction between Waterloo and Alton (Mondays to Saturdays). On Sundays, the service is hourly until the early afternoon when half-hourly. Peak time trains take between 67 and 71 minutes for the whole journey; off-peak trains take between 75 and 78 minutes for the journey and Sunday services take 79 to 85 minutes.

Passenger trains that serve this line during off-peak hours also stop at the following stations (from north to south):

 Clapham Junction
 
 
 

During peak hours trains typically do not stop at Clapham Junction; some peak trains also omit calls at Surbiton, West Byfleet or Brookwood. On Sundays, the service also calls at Wimbledon.

Historical timetables 
From 1937 to 1967, Alton trains ran fast from Waterloo to Surbiton and then ran all stations to Alton.  They formed the front (country) end of an 8-car train that split at Woking with the rear 4 cars running to Portsmouth. The trains ran throughout the day and left Waterloo at 27 and 57 minutes past the hour and took exactly 80 minutes to reach Alton.  Additionally, there were trains in the rush hours that ran fast to Woking and then all stations – at 16:17, 18:14, and 18:17 (also stopping at Surbiton) to Farnham, and at 16:47, 17:17, 17:47 to Alton taking between 72 and 76 minutes.   Trains from Waterloo to Alton from 05:25 to 08:25 left two minutes earlier than the standard departures and called at Wimbledon. All trains took the fast line from Waterloo to Surbiton. The last train in the evening was the 22:57 to Farnham, which ran to Alton on Wednesday and Saturday nights only, arriving at 00:17. On Sundays there was a 23:27 that only ran to Farnham.  On weekdays the 17:27 and 19:27 had connections at Bentley to Bordon with a five-minute connection at Bentley and a journey time to Bordon of 15 minutes.  The diminutive army town of Bordon had a very regular service on Sunday nights from Bentley.

On the up line the pattern was similar, with several departures from Farnham to Waterloo starting at 06:05 and then from Alton at 06:54, then every 30 minutes till 22:54 with three extra rush hour services in the morning. In those days the line from Farnham to Alton was double track.

In the 1980s the pattern was somewhat different: the off-peak trains ran half-hourly and stopped at Surbiton, Woking then all stations, being detached from the Bournemouth (hourly) or Basingstoke (hourly) stopping services. Around 1985 Alton lost its half-hourly service, with half the trains terminating at Farnham. Peak services were approximately every 20 minutes until 1985, half-hourly thereafter, generally going fast Waterloo to Woking, occasionally stopping at West Byfleet or Surbiton

In 1989 the service changed again with three trains an hour as far as Farnham: a fast train (Clapham Junction, Woking and all stations to Alton), a semi-fast (Surbiton, certain stations to Woking, then all to Farnham) and a slow (Clapham Junction, Wimbledon, Surbiton and all stations to Farnham).

Freight services
A daily service used to run to Holybourne Oil Terminal from Fawley, but this service has ceased. In order to facilitate the running around of the locomotive on this oil train, the 10:23 service from Waterloo would terminate short at Farnham and not continue to Alton; and as a result there would be no 12:15 return service from Alton to Farnham, this train beginning its journey from Farnham instead at 12:28. This arrangement with the 10:23 Waterloo to Farnham still happens now, even after the suspension of the oil train.

Oil carrying wagons are stored in the terminal at Holybourne.

Farnham Traincare Depot
Farnham Traincare Depot, in Weydon Lane, Wrecclesham, was opened by the Southern Railway at the time of the electrification of the Portsmouth and Alton lines in 1937. It was refurbished for the introduction of modern units when slam-door trains were replaced circa 2005. At the same time, disused quarry and ballast dump sidings behind the carriage shed were removed and a number of outdoor sidings were laid for overnight storage and servicing of units.

It is between Farnham railway station, Surrey and Bentley (Hampshire) railway station, close to the border between the two counties.

South Western Railway use the depot under the five-to-ten year government franchise operated by the subsidiary. The depot houses mainly Class 450 trains, but also Class 458 and occasionally Class 444 and 456 trains as well.

Notes and references
References

Notes

Further reading

External links
 Alton Line Users Association (ALUA)
 Ordnance Survey

Rail transport in Hampshire
Railway lines opened in 1852
Railway lines in South East England
Standard gauge railways in England
1852 establishments in England